Rahula Anura Attalage a professor of mechanical engineering and the director of the Post Graduate Institute of the Faculty of Engineering at the University of Moratuwa in Sri Lanka.

Education
After completing college at Nalanda College Colombo, Rahula went on to earn a mechanical engineering degree from the University of Moratuwa. He obtained his master's degree in energy technology from the Asian Institute of Technology, Thailand. He also holds a PhD in energy engineering from Ecole des Mines de Paris, France. Attalage has received the University of Moratuwa's award for Outstanding Research Performances on five consecutive occasions.

References

External links
 
 
 

Sri Lankan Buddhists
Sinhalese academics
Alumni of Nalanda College, Colombo
Asian Institute of Technology alumni
Sri Lankan mechanical engineers